The Siberian Seven refers to seven out of twentynine members of two families of persecuted Pentecostals in the Soviet Union who took up residency at the US embassy in Moscow in June 1978. These seven members represented the Vashchenko and Chmykhalov families, both originally from Chernogorsk, Siberia. The seven stayed at the embassy for five years, from June 1978 to June 1983, before all twentynine members were allowed to leave to Israel on a tourist visa. Sixteen members of the families eventually settled in the United States.

See also 
 List of people who took refuge in a diplomatic mission

References

External links 
 Siberian Seven Collection, 1978-1989 Wheaton College Archives & Special Collections

Diplomatic incidents
Soviet Union–United States relations
Soviet defectors to the United States